Brief Candles (1930), Aldous Huxley's fifth collection of short fiction, consists of the following four short stories:

"Chawdron"
"The Rest Cure"
"The Claxtons"
"After the Fireworks"

Brief Candles takes its title from a line in William Shakespeare's Macbeth, from Macbeth's famous soliloquy: "Out, out, brief candle! Life's but a walking shadow, a poor player that struts and frets his hour upon the stage and then is heard no more: it is a tale told by an idiot, full of sound and fury, signifying nothing."

External links
 

1930 short story collections
Short story collections by Aldous Huxley
Chatto & Windus books